The East End is an area of the independent city of Newport News, Virginia, located in the older portion of the port city near the harbor of Hampton Roads.

Notable residents

, attended Huntington High School

, attended Huntington High School

Historic sites

References

External links

Neighborhoods in Newport News, Virginia